Gokuraku-ji or Gokurakuji may refer to:

Temples in Japan
 Gokuraku-ji (Naruto), founded in Naruto, Tokushima Prefecture in 815
 Gokuraku-ji (Kamakura), founded in Kamakura in 1259
 Gokuraku-ji (Kitakami) in Kitakami, Iwate Prefecture
 Gokuraku-ji, later renamed Jōmyō-ji, founded in Kamakura in 1188

Other uses
 Gokurakuji Station, Kamakura, Kanagawa Prefecture, Japan
 Mount Gokurakuji, near Hatsukaichi, Hiroshima Prefecture
 Hōjō Shigetoki (born 1198), also called Lord Gokuraku-ji